Mario Tambini (7 March 1892 – 20 April 1973) was an Italian gymnast. He competed in seven events at the 1928 Summer Olympics.

References

External links
 

1892 births
1973 deaths
Italian male artistic gymnasts
Olympic gymnasts of Italy
Gymnasts at the 1928 Summer Olympics
Place of birth missing